KHCU may refer to:

 KHCU (FM), a radio station (93.1 FM) licensed to serve Concan, Texas, United States
 Kyung Hee Cyber University